Chrysophana is a genus of beetles in the family Buprestidae, containing the following species:

 Chrysophana conicola Van Dyke, 1937
 Chrysophana holzschuhi Bily, 1984
 Chrysophana placida (LeConte, 1854)

References

Buprestidae genera